Nicholas Nickleby, or The Life and Adventures of Nicholas Nickleby, is the third novel by Charles Dickens, originally published as a serial from 1838 to 1839. The character of Nickleby is a young man who must support his mother and sister after his father dies.

Background
The Life and Adventures of Nicholas Nickleby, Containing a Faithful Account of the Fortunes, Misfortunes, Uprisings, Downfallings, and Complete Career of the Nickleby Family saw Dickens return to his favourite publishers and to the format that proved so successful with The Pickwick Papers. The story first appeared in monthly parts, after which it was issued in one volume. Dickens began writing Nickleby while still working on Oliver Twist.

Plot
 Nicholas Nickleby's father dies unexpectedly after losing all of his money in a poor investment. Nicholas, his mother and his younger sister, Kate, are forced to give up their comfortable lifestyle in Devonshire and travel to London to seek the aid of their only living relative, Nicholas's uncle, Ralph Nickleby. Ralph, a cold and ruthless businessman, has no desire to help his destitute relations and hates Nicholas at first sight because he reminds him of his dead brother. He gets Nicholas a very low-paying job as an assistant to Wackford Squeers, who runs the school Dotheboys Hall in Yorkshire. Nicholas is initially wary of Squeers (a very unpleasant man with one eye) because he is gruff and violent towards his young charges, but he tries to quell his suspicions. As Nicholas boards the stagecoach for Greta Bridge, he is handed a letter by Ralph's clerk, Newman Noggs. A once-wealthy businessman, Noggs lost his fortune, became a drunk, and had no other recourse but to seek employment with Ralph, whom he loathes. The letter expresses concern for him as an innocent young man and offers assistance if Nicholas ever requires it. Once he arrives in Yorkshire, Nicholas comes to realise that Squeers is running a scam: he takes in unwanted children (most of whom are orphaned, illegitimate, crippled or deformed) for a high fee, and starves and mistreats them while using the money sent by their parents, who only want to get them out of their way, to pad his own pockets. Squeers and his monstrous wife whip and beat the children regularly while spoiling their own children. Lessons are no better; they show how poorly educated Squeers himself is and he uses the lessons as excuses to send the boys off on chores. While he is there, Nicholas befriends a "simple" boy named Smike, who is older than the other "students" and now acts as an unpaid servant. Nicholas attracts the attention of Fanny Squeers, his employer's plain and shrewish daughter, who deludes herself into thinking that Nicholas is in love with her. She attempts to disclose her affections during a game of cards, but Nicholas doesn't catch her meaning. Instead, he ends up flirting with her friend Tilda Price, to the dismay and anger of both Fanny and Tilda's friendly but crude-mannered fiancé John Browdie. 

After trying to get Nicholas' attention by pretending to faint, Nicholas quickly sees through her ruse and bluntly tells her that he does not return her affections and he wishes to be free of the horrible atmosphere of Dotheboys Hall.
Fanny is then embarrassed by his rejection, earning her hatred and bitterness towards him.  

Fanny uses her new-found loathing of Nicholas to make life difficult for the only friend he has at the school: Smike, whom Squeers takes to beating more and more frequently. One day Smike runs away but is caught and brought back to Dotheboys. Squeers begins to flog him, but Nicholas intervenes. Enraged, Squeers strikes him across the face and Nicholas snaps, beating the schoolmaster violently. During the fight, Fanny steps in and attacks Nicholas, hating him for rejecting her love. Nicholas ignores her and goes on to beat Squeers bloody. Quickly packing his belongings and leaving Dotheboys Hall, he meets John Browdie on the way. Browdie finds the idea that Squeers himself has been beaten uproariously funny, and gives Nicholas money and a walking staff to aid him on his trip back to London. At dawn, he is found by Smike, who begs to come with him. Nicholas and Smike set out towards London. Among other things, Nicholas wants to find out what Squeers is going to tell his uncle.

Meanwhile, Kate and her mother are forced by Ralph to move out of their lodgings in the house of the kindly portrait painter Miss LaCreevy and into a cold and draughty house Ralph owns in a London slum. Ralph finds employment for Kate working for a fashionable milliner, Madame Mantalini. Her husband, Mr Mantalini, is a gigolo who depends on his (significantly older) wife to supply his extravagant tastes, and offends Kate by leering at her. Kate proves initially clumsy at her job, which endears her to the head of the showroom, Miss Knag, a vain and foolish woman who uses Kate to make herself look better. This backfires when a client prefers to be served by the young and pretty Kate rather than the ageing Miss Knag. Kate is blamed for the insult, and as a result, Kate is ostracised by the other milliners and left friendless.

Nicholas seeks out the aid of Newman Noggs, who shows him a letter that Fanny Squeers has written to Ralph. It viciously exaggerates the events of the beating and slanders Nicholas. They suspect Ralph secretly knows the truth but is latching onto Fanny's account to further persecute Nicholas. Noggs tells Nicholas, who is intent on confronting his uncle, that Ralph is out of town and advises him to find a job. Nicholas goes to an employment office, where he encounters a strikingly beautiful girl. His search for employment fails, and he is about to give up when Noggs offers him the meagre position of French teacher to the children of his neighbours, the Kenwigs family, and Nicholas is hired under the assumed name of "Johnson" to teach the children French.

Ralph asks Kate to attend a dinner he is hosting for some business associates. When she arrives she discovers she is the only woman in attendance, and it becomes clear Ralph is using her as bait to entice the foolish nobleman Lord Frederick Verisopht to do business with him. The other guests include Verisopht's mentor and friend, the disreputable nobleman Sir Mulberry Hawk, who humiliates Kate at dinner by making her the subject of an offensive bet (i.e., that she cannot look him in the eye and say that she does not want him to make love to her--NOTE:  "Make love" did not mean sex in the novel, but rather to be romanced). She flees the table but is later accosted by Hawk. He attempts to force himself on her but is stopped by Ralph. Ralph shows some unexpected tenderness towards Kate but insinuates that he will withdraw his financial help if she tells her mother about what happened.

The next day, Nicholas discovers that his uncle has returned. He visits his mother and sister just as Ralph is reading them Fanny Squeers' letter and slandering Nicholas. He confronts his uncle, who vows to give no financial assistance to the Nicklebys as long as Nicholas stays with them. His hand forced, Nicholas agrees to leave London but warns Ralph that a day of reckoning will one day come between them.

The next morning, Nicholas and Smike travel towards Portsmouth with the intention of becoming sailors. At an inn, they encounter the theatrical manager Vincent Crummles, who hires Nicholas (still going under the name of Johnson) on sight. Nicholas is the new juvenile lead, and also playwright, with the task of adapting French tragedies into English and then modifying them for the troupe's minimal dramatic abilities. Nicholas and Smike join the acting company and are warmly received by the troupe, which includes Crummles's formidable wife, their daughter, "The Infant Phenomenon", and many other eccentric and melodramatic thespians. Nicholas and Smike make their debuts in Romeo and Juliet, as Romeo and the Apothecary respectively, and are met with great acclaim from the provincial audiences. Nicholas enjoys a flirtation with his Juliet, the lovely Miss Snevellici.

Back in London, Mr Mantalini's reckless spending has bankrupted his wife. Madame Mantalini is forced to sell her business to Miss Knag, whose first order of business is to fire Kate. She finds employment as the companion of the social-climbing Mrs Wittiterly. Meanwhile, Sir Mulberry Hawk begins a plot to humiliate Kate for refusing his advances. He uses Lord Frederick, who is infatuated with her, to discover where she lives from Ralph. He is about to succeed in this plot when Mrs. Nickleby enters Ralph's office, and the two rakes switch their attentions from Kate's uncle to her mother, successfully worming their way into Mrs Nickleby's company and gaining access to the Wittiterly house. Mrs. Wittiterly grows jealous and admonishes Kate for flirting with the noblemen. The unfairness of this accusation makes Kate so angry that she rebukes her employer, who flies into a fit of hysterics. With no other recourse, Kate goes to her uncle for assistance, but he refuses to help her, citing his business relationships with Hawk and Verisopht. It is left to Newman Noggs to come to her aid, and he writes to Nicholas, telling him in vague terms of his sister's urgent need of him. Nicholas immediately quits the Crummles troupe and returns to London.

Noggs and Miss LaCreevy confer and decide to delay telling Nicholas of Kate's plight until it is too late at night for him to seek out Hawk and take violent action. So, when Nicholas arrives, both Noggs and Miss La Creevy are out. Nicholas is about to search the city for them when he accidentally overhears Hawk and Lord Frederick rudely toasting Kate in a coffeehouse. He is able to glean from their conversation what has happened and confronts them. Hawk refuses to give Nicholas his name or respond to his accusations. When he attempts to leave, Nicholas follows him out, and leaps onto the running board of his carriage, demanding his name. Hawk strikes him with a riding crop, and Nicholas loses his temper, returning the blow and spooking the horses, causing the carriage to crash. Hawk is injured in the crash and vows revenge, but Lord Verisopht, remorseful for his treatment of Kate, tells him that he will attempt to stop him. Later, after Hawk has recovered, they quarrel over Hawk's insistence on revenging himself against Nicholas. Verisopht strikes Hawk, resulting in a duel. Verisopht is killed, and Hawk flees to France. As a result, Ralph loses a large sum of money owed to him by the deceased lord.

Nicholas collects Kate from the Wittiterlys, and with their mother and Smike, they move back into Miss LaCreevy's house. Nicholas pens a letter to Ralph, refusing, on behalf of his family, a penny of his uncle's money or influence. Returning to the employment office, Nicholas meets Charles Cheeryble, a wealthy and extremely benevolent merchant who runs a business with his twin brother Ned. Hearing Nicholas's story, the brothers take him into their employ at a generous salary and provide his family with a small house in a London suburb.

Ralph encounters a beggar, who recognises him and reveals himself as Brooker, Ralph's former employee. He attempts to blackmail Ralph with a piece of unknown information but is driven off. Returning to his office, Ralph receives Nicholas's letter and begins plotting against his nephew in earnest. Wackford Squeers returns to London and joins Ralph in his plots.

Smike, on a London street, has the misfortune to run into Squeers, who kidnaps him. Luckily for Smike, John Browdie is honeymooning in London with his new wife Tilda and discovers his predicament. When they have dinner with Squeers, Browdie fakes an illness and takes the opportunity to rescue Smike and send him back to Nicholas. In gratitude, Nicholas invites the Browdies to dinner. At the party, also attended by the Cheerybles' nephew Frank and their elderly clerk Tim Linkinwater, Ralph and Squeers attempt to reclaim Smike by presenting forged documents to the effect that he is the long-lost son of a man named Snawley (who, in actuality, is a friend of Squeers with children at Dotheboys Hall). Smike refuses to go, but the threat of legal action remains.

While at work, Nicholas encounters the beautiful young woman he had seen in the employment office and realises he is in love with her. The brothers tell him that her name is Madeline Bray, the penniless daughter of a debtor, Walter Bray, and enlist his help in obtaining small sums of money for her by commissioning her artwork, the only way they can help her due to her tyrannical father.

Arthur Gride, an elderly miser, offers to pay a debt Ralph is owed by Walter Bray in exchange for the moneylender's help. Gride has illegally gained possession of the will of Madeline's grandfather, and she will become an heiress upon the event of her marriage. The two moneylenders persuade Bray to bully his daughter into accepting the disgusting Gride as a husband, with the promise of paying off his debts. Ralph is not aware of Nicholas's involvement with the Brays, and Nicholas does not discover Ralph's scheme until the eve of the wedding. He appeals to Madeline to cancel the wedding, but despite her feelings for Nicholas, she is too devoted to her dying father to go against his wishes. On the day of the wedding, Nicholas attempts to stop it once more but his efforts prove academic when Bray, guilt-ridden at the sacrifice his daughter has made for him, dies unexpectedly. Madeline thus has no reason to marry Gride and Nicholas and Kate take her to their house to recover.

Smike has contracted tuberculosis and become dangerously ill. In a last attempt to save his friend's health, Nicholas takes him to his childhood home in Devonshire, but Smike's health rapidly deteriorates. On his deathbed, Smike is startled to see the man who brought him to Squeers's school. Nicholas dismisses it as an illusion but it is later revealed that Smike was right. After confessing his love for Kate, Smike dies peacefully in Nicholas's arms.

When they return to Gride's home after the aborted wedding, Ralph and Gride discover that Peg Sliderskew, Gride's aged housekeeper, has robbed Gride, taking, amongst other things, the will. To get it back, Ralph enlists Wackford Squeers's services to track down Peg. Noggs discovers this plot, and with the help of Frank Cheeryble, he is able to recover the will and have Squeers arrested.

 
The Cheeryble brothers confront Ralph, informing him that his various schemes against Nicholas have failed. They advise him to retire from London before charges are brought up against him, as Squeers is determined to confess all and implicate Ralph. He refuses their help but is summoned back to their offices that evening and told that Smike is dead. When he reacts to the news with vicious glee, the brothers reveal their final card. The beggar Brooker emerges and tells Ralph that Smike was his son. As a young man, Ralph had married a woman for her fortune but kept it secret so she would not forfeit her inheritance for marrying without her brother's consent, and wait for the brother to die. She eventually left him after bearing him a son, whom he entrusted to Brooker, who was then his clerk. Brooker, taking the opportunity for vengeance, took the boy to Squeers' school and told Ralph the boy had died. Brooker now repents his action, but a transportation sentence kept him from putting the matter right. Devastated at the thought that his only son died as the best friend of his greatest enemy, Ralph commits suicide. His ill-gotten fortune ends up in the state coffers because he died intestate and his estranged relatives decline to claim it.

Squeers is sentenced to transportation to Australia, and, upon hearing this, the boys at Dotheboys Hall rebel against the Squeers family and escape with the assistance of John Browdie. Nicholas becomes a partner in the Cheerybles' firm and marries Madeline. Kate and Frank Cheeryble also marry, as do Tim Linkinwater and Miss LaCreevy. Brooker dies penitent. Noggs recovers his respectability. The Nicklebys and their now extended family return to Devonshire, where they live in peace and contentment and grieve over Smike's grave.

Major characters
As in most of Dickens's works, there is a sprawling number of characters in the book. The major characters in Nicholas Nickleby include:

The Nickleby family
 Nicholas Nickleby: The hero of the novel. His father has died and left Nicholas and his family penniless. Nicholas is honest and steadfast, but his youth and inexperience of the world can lead him to be violent, naïve, and emotional. In his preface to the novel, Dickens writes, "There is only one other point, on which I would desire to offer a remark. If Nicholas be not always found to be blameless or agreeable, he is not always intended to appear so. He is a young man of an impetuous temper and of little or no experience; and I saw no reason why such a hero should be lifted out of nature." He devotes himself primarily to his friends and family and fiercely defies those who wrong the ones he loves.
 Ralph Nickleby: The book's principal antagonist, Nicholas's uncle. He seems to care about nothing but money and takes an immediate dislike to the idealistic Nicholas; however, he does harbour something of a soft spot for Kate. Ralph's anger at Nicholas's beating of Wackford Squeers leads to a serious rift with his nephew, and after Nicholas interferes with his machinations several more times, Ralph schemes to deliberately hurt and humiliate Nicholas; but the only man Ralph ends up destroying is himself. When it is revealed that Smike was his son, and that the boy died hating him, he takes his own life. He dies without a will, and his family refuses to take his property, so his hard-earned fortune is taken by the Crown and lost.
 Catherine "Kate" Nickleby: Nicholas's younger sister. Kate is a fairly passive character, typical of Dickensian women, but she shares some of her brother's fortitude and strong will. She does not blanch at hard labour to earn her keep, and defends herself against the lecherous Sir Mulberry Hawk. She finds well-deserved happiness with Frank Cheeryble.
 Mrs. Catherine Nickleby: Nicholas and Kate's mother, who provides much of the novel's comic relief. The muddleheaded Mrs. Nickleby often does not see the true evil her children encounter until it is directly pointed out to her, and her obtuseness occasionally worsens her children's predicaments. She is stubborn, prone to long digressions on irrelevant or unimportant topics and unrealistic fantasies, and displays an often vague grasp of what is going on around her.

Associates of Ralph Nickleby
Newman Noggs: Ralph's clerk, who becomes Nicholas's devoted friend. He was once a gentleman but lost his money and went bankrupt. He is an alcoholic, and his general good nature and insight into human nature is hidden under a veneer of irrational tics and erratic behaviour.
 Sir Mulberry Hawk: A lecherous nobleman who has taken Lord Verisopht under his wing. One of the most truly evil characters in the novel, he forces himself upon Kate and pursues her solely to humiliate her after she rejects him. He is beaten by Nicholas, and swears revenge, but is prevented in this by Lord Verisopht. He kills Verisopht in a duel and must flee to France, putting a stop to his plans of revenge. He lives abroad in luxury until he runs out of money, and eventually returns to England and dies in debtors' prison.
Lord Frederick Verisopht: Hawk's friend and dupe, a rich young nobleman. He owes both Ralph and Sir Mulberry vast sums of money. He becomes infatuated with Kate and is manipulated by Hawk into finding her whereabouts. After Nicholas confronts them in a coffeehouse, Lord Frederick realises the shame of his behaviour and threatens Hawk if he attempts retaliation for the injuries Nicholas caused him. This quarrel eventually leads to a physical fight, which results in a duel in which Lord Frederick is killed. In death, he manages to ruin both Ralph and Sir Mulberry as he dies unmarried, which, in the terms of his father's will, disinherits him and forces his creditors to lose massive amounts of money.
Mr Pluck and Mr Pyke: Hangers-on to Hawk and Verisopht. They are never seen apart and are quite indistinguishable from one another. Pluck and Pyke are intelligent, sly and dapper, perfect tools to do Hawk's dirty work for him.
Arthur Gride: An elderly associate of Ralph. A miser, he lives in a large, empty house extremely frugally, despite his vast wealth. He gains possession of the will of Madeline's grandfather, and attempts to cheat her out of her fortune by marrying her. He is cowardly, servile and greedy, with no redeeming characteristics whatsoever (although he does know something about romantic feelings). He alone among Ralph's conspirators escapes legal punishment, but he is eventually murdered by burglars, who have heard rumours of his vast wealth.
Peg Sliderskew: Gride's elderly housekeeper. Illiterate, very deaf, and becoming senile, she ends up playing a large part in the denouement when she steals a number of papers from Gride, including Madeline's grandfather's will.
Brooker: An old beggar. A mysterious figure who appears several times during the novel. We eventually find out that he was formerly Ralph's clerk. He was responsible for bringing Ralph's son (Smike) to Dotheboys Hall. An ex-convict, he returns to extort money from Ralph with the information that his son is alive. When that fails, he goes to Noggs, and eventually brings his story to light. In the epilogue, it is mentioned that he dies repentant of his crimes.

Yorkshire
Smike: A poor drudge living in Squeers's "care". About 18 years old, Smike is a pathetic figure, perpetually ill and dim-witted, who has been in Squeers's care since he was very young. Nicholas gives him the courage to run away, but when that fails Nicholas saves him and the two become travelling companions and close friends. He falls in love with Kate, but his heart is broken when she falls in love with Frank Cheeryble. After Smike dies peacefully of "a dread disease" (tuberculosis), it is revealed that he is Ralph Nickleby's son, and thus first cousin to Nicholas and to Kate.
Wackford Squeers: A cruel, one-eyed, Yorkshire "schoolmaster". He runs Dotheboys Hall, a boarding school for unwanted children. He mistreats the boys horribly, starving them and beating them regularly. He gets his comeuppance at the hands of Nicholas when he is beaten in retaliation for the whipping of Smike. He travels to London after he recovers, and partakes in more bad business, fulfilling his grudge against Nicholas by becoming a close partner in Ralph's schemes to fake Smike's parentage and later to obfuscate the will that would make Madeline Bray an heiress. He is arrested during the last of these tasks and sentenced to be transported to Australia.

Dickens insisted that Squeers was based not on an individual Yorkshire schoolmaster but was a composite of several he had met while visiting the county to investigate such establishments for himself, with the "object [of] calling public attention to the system." However literary critic and author Cumberland Clark (1862–1941) notes that the denial was prompted by fear of libel and that the inspiration for the character was in fact William Shaw, of William Shaw's Academy, Bowes. Clark notes a court case brought against Shaw by the parents of a boy blinded through neglect while at the school, in which the description of the premises matches closely that in the novel. A surviving example of Shaw's business card is compared to that offered by Squeers in the novel and the wording is shown to match that used by Dickens. Shaw's descendant Ted Shaw is president of the Dickens Fellowship and claims that Dickens had "sensationalised and exaggerated the facts".
Mrs Squeers: is even more cruel and less affectionate than her husband to the boys in their care. She dislikes Nicholas on sight and attempts to make his life at Dotheboys Hall as difficult as possible.
Fanny Squeers: The Squeers' daughter. She is 23, unattractive, ill-tempered, and eager to find a husband. She falls in love with Nicholas until he bluntly rebuffs her affections, which causes her to antagonise him passionately and openly. Tilda Price is her best friend but the relationship is strained by Fanny's pride and spitefulness. She is haughty, self-important and is deluded about her beauty and station.
Young Wackford Squeers: The Squeers' loutish son. His parents dote on him and he is very fat as a result of their spoiling him. He is preoccupied with filling his belly as often as he can and bullying his father's boys, to his father's great pride. When the boys revolt, they dip his head several times in a bowl of the disgusting "brimstone" (sulphur) and treacle "remedy" (actually an appetite suppressant) they are regularly force-fed on pain of punishment.
John Browdie: A bluff Yorkshire corn merchant, with a loud, boisterous sense of humour. At the start of the novel he is engaged to Tilda Price and marries her about halfway through the book. Although he and Nicholas get off on the wrong foot, they become good friends when John helps Nicholas escape from Yorkshire. He later comes to London on his honeymoon and rescues Smike from Squeers' captivity, proving himself a resourceful and intelligent ally.
Matilda "Tilda" Price (Browdie): Fanny's best friend and Browdie's fiancée. A pretty miller's daughter of 18, Tilda puts up with Fanny's pettiness because of their childhood friendship but later breaks off their friendship after she realises the extent of Fanny's selfishness. She is rather coquettish but settles down happily with John Browdie.
Phib (Phoebe): The Squeers' housemaid, who is forced to endure Mrs Squeers' foul temper and Fanny's scorn in order to keep her job.  She flatters Fanny to keep her in good humour. She is described as hungry.

Around London
Miss La Creevy: The Nicklebys' landlady. A small, kindly (if somewhat ridiculous) woman in her fifties, she is a miniature-portrait painter. She is the first friend the Nicklebys make in London, and one of the truest. She is rewarded for her good-heartedness when she falls in love with Tim Linkinwater.
Hannah: Miss La Creevy's faithful but noticeably stupid maid.
Mr Snawley: An oil merchant who puts his two stepsons into Squeers's "care". He pretends to be Smike's father to help Squeers get back at Nicholas, but, when pursued by the Cheerybles, cracks under the pressure and eventually confesses everything.
Mr and Madame Mantalini: Milliners, Kate's employers. Alfred Muntle (he changed his name to Mantalini for business purposes) is a handsome man with a large bushy black mustache who lives off his wife's business. He is not above stealing from his wife and dramatically threatens to kill himself whenever he does not get his way. Madame Mantalini is much older than her husband and equally prone to dramatics. She eventually gets wise and divorces him, but not until he has ruined her with extravagant spending and she is forced to sell the business to Miss Knag. Mantalini is seen again at the end of the book living in much reduced circumstances, romantically tied to a washerwoman, but still up to his old tricks.
Miss Knag: Mrs Mantalini's right-hand woman and the chief assistant in the showroom. Miss Knag is well into middle age but is under the impression that she is exceptionally beautiful. When Kate begins her employment with the Mantalinis, Miss Knag is quite kind to her because the younger woman is clumsy, making Miss Knag look more accomplished by comparison. But when she is insulted by a disgruntled customer who prefers to be served by Kate, she blames Kate and ostracizes her. She takes over the business when the Mantalinis go bankrupt, immediately firing Kate. A spinster, she lives with her brother Mortimer, a failed novelist.
The Kenwigs family: Newman Noggs's neighbours. Mr Kenwigs and his wife Susan are dependent on the latter's wealthy uncle Mr Lillyvick, and everything they do is designed to please him so he will not write their children (including their baby, named Lillyvick) out of his will. Their daughter Morleena is an awkward child of seven. The family and their acquaintances are described by Dickens as "exceptionally common."
Mr Lillyvick: Mrs Kenwigs's uncle. He is a collector of the water rate, a position which gives him great importance among his poor relatives. They bend over backwards to please him, and he is completely used to getting his way. He falls in love with Miss Petowker and marries her, to the Kenwigs' great distress. When she elopes with another man, he comes back to his family a sadder but wiser man.
Henrietta Petowker: Of the Theatre Royal, Drury Lane. A minor actress with a prestigious company and a major star with the significantly less prestigious Crummles troupe. Mrs Crummles' protégée. She marries Mr Lillyvick after meeting him at the Kenwigs' wedding anniversary party, but leaves him for another man within a few months.
Henry and Julia Wititterly: A wealthy, social-climbing couple who employ Kate as a companion to Mrs Wittiterly. Mrs Wittiterly is a hypochondriac and puts on a show of her frailty and poor health, but she has a fierce temper when she does not get her way. Mr Wittiterly flatters his wife and toadies to her every whim. They are oblivious to the degradation Kate is subjected to under their noses, only concerned that they are being visited by noblemen.  Mrs. Wititterly becomes jealous of Kate.  She reprimands Kate for flirting with the noblemen that call, but never allows Kate to miss the visits since it's obvious that she is the reason for the call.  Nicholas rescues Kate from their employ, and they are happy to see her go.  They do not pay Kate her last salary.
Charles and Ned Cheeryble: Identical twin brothers, wealthy "German-merchants" (merchants who trade internationally) who are as magnanimous as they are jovial. Remembering their humble beginnings, they spend much of their time doing charity work and helping those in need. This generosity leads them to give Nicholas a job and provide for his family, and almost single-handedly revive his faith in the goodness of man. They become key figures in the development of Ralph's defeat and the Nicklebys' happy ending.
Frank Cheeryble: Ned and Charles's nephew, who is just as open-hearted as his uncles. He shares Nicholas's streak of anger when his sense of chivalry is roused; Nicholas first meets him after he has kicked a man for insulting Madeline Bray. He falls in love with Kate and later marries her.
Madeline Bray: A beautiful but destitute young woman. Proud and dutiful to her dying father, she is willing to throw her life away if it means ensuring his comfort. Nicholas falls in love with her at first sight, and she comes to feel the same way about him.
Walter Bray: Madeline's father, formerly a handsome gentleman. He is an extremely selfish man who has wasted his wife's fortune and is dying in a debtors' prison, owing vast sums of money to both Ralph and Gride. He maintains a scornful and prideful attitude towards Nicholas.  He fools himself that he is acting for the benefit of his daughter by agreeing to her marriage with Gride, but when he realizes what he has done, he dies of grief before the marriage goes through, freeing Madeline from her obligations.
Tim Linkinwater: The Cheerybles' devoted clerk. An elderly, stout, pleasant gentleman, he is jokingly referred to by the Brothers as "a Fierce Lion". He is prone to hyperbole and obstinately refuses to go into retirement. He finds happiness with Miss La Creevy.
The Man Next Door: A madman who lives next to the Nickleby family's cottage in the latter part of the novel. He falls instantly in love with Mrs. Nickleby, and he repeatedly throws vegetables over the wall in their garden as a token of his affections. To Kate's distress, Mrs. Nickleby refuses to believe that her suitor is insane until he suddenly switches his attentions to Miss LaCreevy.

The Crummles troupe
Mr Vincent Crummles: Head of the Crummles theatre troupe, a larger-than-life actor-manager who takes Nicholas under his wing. He takes great pride in his profession, but also sometimes yearns for a quieter life, settled down with his wife and children. Eventually, he and his family take their act to America to pursue greater success on the theatrical stage.
Mrs Crummles: Mr Crummles's wife. A formidable but loving presence in the company, she is a great diva, but Dickens leaves the question of her actual ability up to the reader.
Miss Ninetta Crummles, The "Infant Phenomenon": Daughter of Mr and Mrs Crummles. She is a very prominent member of the Crummles troupe: a dancing part is written for her in every performance, even if there is no place for it. She is supposedly ten years old, but is actually closer to eighteen, having been kept on a steady diet of gin to keep her looking young.  (Said to be inspired by English child actress Jean Margaret Davenport, with her parents the inspiration for Vincent and Mrs. Crummles as well.) 
Mr Folair: A pantomimist with the Crummles company. He is an apt flatterer but does not hesitate to say exactly what he thinks of people once their backs are turned.
Miss Snevellicci: The talented leading lady of the Crummles troupe. She and Nicholas flirt heavily, and there is a mutual attraction, but nothing comes of it. She eventually leaves the troupe to get married.
Mr Lenville: A melodramatic, self-centred tragedian, who becomes jealous of the attention Nicholas is receiving as an actor, and attempts to pull his nose in front of the company, an act which results in the actor himself being knocked down and his cane broken by Nicholas.

Analysis
 Arthur Adrian has examined the effect on Yorkshire schools of their representation in the novel.
 Galia Benzimann has investigated the sociopolitical ramifications and artistic manner of Dickens depiction of Dotheboys School, in the context of boarding school education in northern England and child labour concerns in general.
 Joseph Childers has studied the themes of commerce and business in the novel.
 Carolyn Dever has examined the depiction of emotional states and character in the novel via such genres as melodrama.
 Timothy Gilmore has analysed the presentation of capitalism and commodification in the novel.
 Richard Hannaford has discussed Dickens's use of fairy tale motifs in the novel.
 Mark M. Hennelly, Jr. has critiqued various scenes and performances of astonishment as an element of theatricality in the novel.
 Carol Hanbery Mackay has examined the use of techniques of melodrama in the novel.
 Andrew Mangham has studied parallels in depictions away from strict realism between William Hogarth and Dickens, in the specific context of the latter's Nicholas Nickleby.
 Sylvia Manning has examined Dickens use of comic parody in contrast with more serious depictions of similar plot elements in the overall narrative.
 Jerome Meckier has discussed structural aspects of the novel on two levels, the serial structure and the overall single-narrative structure.
 Tore Rem has critiqued the role of the Crummles episodes in the novel.
 Leslie Thompson has evaluated the soliloquies of Mrs. Nickleby in the novel.
 Leona Toker has commented on the presence of elements related to the discourse on Lent, with particular relation to hunger and fasting, in the novel.

Adaptations

Theatre
The novel has been adapted for stage, film or television at least seven times. The earliest theatrical version actually appeared before publication of the serialised novel was finished, with the resolution of the stage play wildly different from that of the eventual finished novel. Dickens's offence at this plagiarism prompted him to have Nicholas encounter a "literary gentleman" in chapter forty-eight of the novel. The gentleman brags that he has dramatised two hundred and forty-seven novels "as fast as they had come out – in some cases faster than they had come out", and claims to have thus bestowed fame on their authors. In response Nicholas delivers a lengthy and heated condemnation of the practice of adapting still-unfinished books without the author's permission, going so far as to say:

The 1838 play Nicholas Nickleby; or, Doings at Do-The-Boys Hall premièred at the Adelphi Theatre and City of London Theatre, and featured Mary Anne Keeley as Smike.

An 1850s American version featured Joseph Jefferson as Newman Noggs; another in the late 19th century featured Nellie Farren as Smike.

The 1973 musical Smike is an adaptation focusing on the character Smike, written by Simon May, Clive Barnett and Roger Holman.

A large-scale theatrical production, The Life and Adventures of Nicholas Nickleby, by playwright David Edgar, premiered in 1980 in the West End by the Royal Shakespeare Company. It was a theatrical experience which lasted more than ten hours (counting intermissions and a dinner break – the actual playing time was approximately eight-and-a-half hours). The production received both critical and popular acclaim. All of the actors played multiple roles because of the huge number of characters, except for Roger Rees, who played Nicholas, and David Threlfall, who played Smike (due to the large amount of time they were on stage). The play moved to Broadway in 1981.

In 2006 Edgar prepared a shorter version for a production at the Chichester Festival, which transferred in December 2007 and January 2008 to the Gielgud Theatre in the West End. This version has been produced in the US by the California Shakespeare Festival.

Film and television
Film and television adaptations of Nicholas Nickleby include:
 A 1903 two-minute short showing the fight scene at Dotheboys Hall.
 Nicholas Nickleby (1912), a half-hour film that attempted to cover most of the novel, featuring Victory Bateman as Miss La Creevey and Ethyle Cooke as Miss Snevellici.
 The Life and Adventures of Nicholas Nickleby (1947), the first sound film adaptation, starring Cedric Hardwicke as Ralph Nickleby, Sally Ann Howes as Kate, Derek Bond as Nicholas and Stanley Holloway as Crummles.
 Nicholas Nickleby (1957), a BBC TV serial with William Russell in the title role. No episodes survive.
 Nicholas Nickleby (1968), a BBC One TV series, starring Martin Jarvis. All episodes exist.
 Nicholas Nickleby (1977), a BBC TV series directed by Christopher Barry, starring Nigel Havers in the title role, Derek Francis as Wackford Squeers and Patricia Routledge as Madame Mantalini.
 The Life and Adventures of Nicholas Nickleby (1982), a videotaped version of the Royal Shakespeare Company's stage adaptation, shown on Channel 4 as three two-hour episodes and one three-hour episode. In 1983, it was shown on television in the United States, where it won an Emmy Award for Best Mini-Series. This version was released on DVD and rebroadcast in December 2007 on BBC Four.
 Nicholas Nickleby (1985), an animated version produced for television by Burbank Films Australia.
 The Life and Adventures of Nicholas Nickleby (2001), an ITV television film directed by Stephen Whittaker. It features James D'Arcy, Charles Dance, Pam Ferris, Lee Ingleby, Gregor Fisher, Tom Hollander, J. J. Feild and Tom Hiddleston. The film won a BAFTA and an RTS award for costume design.
 Nicholas Nickleby (2002), a film directed by American director Douglas McGrath and featuring Charlie Hunnam, Anne Hathaway, Jamie Bell, Alan Cumming, Jim Broadbent, Christopher Plummer, Juliet Stevenson, Nathan Lane, Tom Courtenay and Barry Humphries.
 Nick Nickleby (2012), a five-part BBC series that moved the story to the modern day (with several changes to the plot and characters). It was filmed in Belfast, Northern Ireland, with mainly local actors. The title character was played by Andrew Simpson, with Linda Bassett as Mrs Smike, Adrian Dunbar as Ralph Nickleby, Jonathan Harden as Newman Noggs (also narrating the series), Bronagh Gallagher as Mrs Nickleby and Jayne Wisener (Kat Nickleby) also starring. It was produced by Kindle Entertainment Ltd and distributed by Indigo Film and Television.

Publication
Nicholas Nickleby was originally issued in 19 monthly numbers; the last was a double-number and cost two shillings instead of one. Each number comprised 32 pages of text and two illustrations by Phiz:

 I – March 1838 (chapters 1–4);
 II – April 1838 (chapters 5–7);
 III – May 1838 (chapters 8–10);
 IV – June 1838 (chapters 11–14);
 V – July 1838 (chapters 15–17);
 VI – August 1838 (chapters 18–20);
 VII – September 1838 (chapters 21–23);
 VIII – October 1838 (chapters 24–26);
 IX – November 1838 (chapters 27–29);
 X – December 1838 (chapters 30–33);
 XI – January 1839 (chapters 34–36);
 XII – February 1839 (chapters 37–39);
 XIII – March 1839 (chapters 40–42);
 XIV – April 1839 (chapters 43–45);
 XV – May 1839 (chapters 46–48);
 XVI – June 1839 (chapters 49–51);
 XVII – July 1839 (chapters 52–54);
 XVIII – August 1839 (chapters 55–58);
 XIX–XX – September 1839 (chapters 59–65).

References

External links

Analysis
Robert Giddings, reviewing the 2002 movie, but considerably more insights about the novel itself.
Nicholas Nickleby - The theme of Nicholas Nickleby - a detailed examination.
George Gissing, The Immortal Dickens, 1925.
G. K. Chesterton, Appreciations and Criticisms of the Works of Charles Dickens, 1911.

Resources
Nicholas Nickleby Selected Bibliography 2006

 
1839 British novels
British novels adapted into films
British novels adapted into plays
British novels adapted into television shows
Chapman & Hall books
English novels
Novels by Charles Dickens
Novels first published in serial form
Novels set in London
Novels set in Yorkshire